KSIB may refer to:

 KSIB (AM), a radio station (1520 AM) licensed to Creston, Iowa, United States
 KSIB-FM, a radio station (101.3 FM) licensed to Creston, Iowa, United States